Antonio Maceo may refer to:
Antonio Maceo Grajales, commander in the Cuban revolutionary army

Cuba 
Antonio Maceo, Granma Province
Antonio Maceo, Habana Province
Antonio Maceo, Holguín Province
Antonio Maceo, Santiago de Cuba Province
Antonio Maceo Airport, serving Santiago de Cuba

See also
Antonio Maceo (Mexico City Metrobús), a BRT station in Mexico City